Erdei  or Erdey is a Hungarian habitational surname originally used to denote a person living or working in or near a woodland or forest, thus roughly corresponding to the English surnames Woodman or Forester. It may refer to:

Erdei 
 Carlo Erdei (born 1996), Romanian football player
 Ferenc Erdei (1910–1971), Hungarian politician
 Viktor Erdei (1879-1945), Hungarian artist
 Zsolt Erdei (born 1974), Hungarian boxer

Erdey 
 Dale M. Erdey (born 1954), American politician
 Tibor Erdey-Grúz (1902–1976), Hungarian chemist and politician

Hungarian-language surnames
Toponymic surnames